Gong Shang Ri Bao was a Chinese newspaper in Tangshan, Hebei Province from 1932 to 1938.

Notable people
 Hong Linge, former editor-in-chief, civilian militia during the Second Sino-Japanese War.

References

Chinese-language newspapers
Defunct newspapers published in China
Tangshan